Makhuduthamaga is a municipality in Sekhukhune District Municipality, Limpopo Province, South Africa.

The name is derived from the liberatory name given to those who supported the anti-apartheid struggle in Sekhukhuneland in the 1950s. Makhuduthamaga waged a war against the white commissioner and his assailants, Marentsara.

Main places
The 2001 census divided the municipality into the following main places:

Politics 
The municipal council consists of sixty-two members elected by mixed-member proportional representation. Thirty-one councillors are elected by first-past-the-post voting in thirty-one wards, while the remaining thirty-one are chosen from party lists so that the total number of party representatives is proportional to the number of votes received. In the election of 3 August 2016, the African National Congress (ANC) won a majority of forty-three seats on the council.
The following table shows the results of the election.

References

External links

Local municipalities of the Sekhukhune District Municipality